Marie Terese Alvén, (5 June 1982 - 11 June 2019) was a Swedish writer and blogger about health.

Terese Alvén was one of Sweden's first workout bloggers when she started the blog Spark i baken in 2007. After being featured as a health and workout blogger for one year in the women's magazine Amelia internet site, she returned to blogging on her own platform in her own name in August 2017.

In June 2017, she was named as Top 10 of Sweden's best health bloggers by the magazine SportHälsa. Alvén also was the winner in the categories, "Health profile of the Year" and "Guldäpplet" by the magazine Hälsa. In 2009, her blog Spark i baken was voted as the best workout blog by the readers of the magazine Cosmopolitan.

Besides the blogging, she was also a lecturer in the subjects of health, workouts with family, and she also talked about body image. She also wrote several books about workouts and how to stay healthy.

She was married to Glenn Boström until her death in 2019. She died in June 2019, after suffering from ovarian cancer.

Bibliography
2013 – Viktig: från matmissbrukare till träningsförebild (Hoi förlag), 
2014 – Träna tillsammans med familjen, (Hoi förlag), 
2015 – Träna tillsammans med Tia (Idus förlag), 
2016 – Jätteviktig: att må bra efter en ätstörning (Hoi förlag), 
2019 – Rörelserik: 52 utmaningar som får igång hela familjen (Ehrlin Publishing),

References 

2019 deaths
1982 births
Swedish bloggers
Swedish women bloggers